Aik Aur Sitam Hai is a 2019 Pakistani television series, co-produced by Evolution Media and TNI Productions. The serial airs weekly episode on A-Plus TV every wednesday replacing Khafa Khafa Zindagi. It stars Maria Wasti, Alyy Khan, Fawad Jalal and Beenish Chohan.The title song of the series is sung by actress Zhalay Sarhadi.

Shooting location 
Karachi & TandoAdam Sindh

Cast 
 Maria Wasti as Ruqsana
 Alyy Khan as Rasheed
 Beenish Chohan as Saira
 Fawad Jalal as Fahad
 Adnan Shah Tipu
 Sumbul Shahid

References

External links 
 Official website

Pakistani drama television series
Urdu-language telenovelas
2019 Pakistani television series debuts
A-Plus TV original programming